Tetrachloroferrate is the polyatomic ion having chemical formula . The metallate can be formed when ferric chloride abstracts a chloride ion from various other chloride salts. The resulting tetrachloroferrate salts are typically soluble in non-polar solvents. The tetrachloroferrate anion, with iron(III) in the center, has tetrahedral geometry. It is useful as a non-coordinating anion comparable to perchlorate. Several organoammonium salts have been studied for their novel material properties. 1-Butyl-3-methylimidazolium tetrachloroferrate is one of several ionic liquids that are magnetic. Trimethylchloromethylammonium tetrachloroferrate is a plastic crystal that can behave as a molecular switch in response to several different types of inputs.

References

External links 
 

Chlorometallates
Ferrates
Iron(III) compounds
Iron complexes